Apoteket Hjorten (English: Pharmacy Hjorten) was a pharmacy located at Grønland in Oslo, Norway. The name "Apoteket Hjorten" is used for a number of pharmacies in several Norwegian cities such as Fredrikstad and Trondheim. The pharmacy is now renamed to Vitusapotek Hjorten, and the modern building is located in Smalgangen 5.

The pharmacy opened in 1857 after it was determined by a royal decree on December 4, 1856. Apoteket Hjorten was the fifth pharmacy in Christiania. After a fire in year 1859 in which 18 people died, a new pharmacy building was built. The construction of this building, which was designed by Chr. H. Grosch, finished in 1861. After a rebuilding in 1963, the original officine was handed by pharmacist Anders Tenøe to Pharmacy Historical Museum of Norway (Norwegian: Norsk Farmasihistorisk Museum) and mounted in its entirety in the Norwegian Museum of Cultural History (No: Norsk folkemuseum) at Bygdøy. The pharmacy was rebuilt in 1986, and refurbished to a restaurant in year 2000. Today, the building houses the restaurant Dattera til Hagen.

Literature 
 Fjeldstad, Trygve: «Apoteket Hjorten i Oslo, En langvarig byggesak» i  Norges Apotekerforenings Tidsskrift nr.9 1986 pp. 229–235
 Flod, Ingeborg og Bendel, Leif A. Norges Apotek og deres innehavere vol III pp. 393–397, vol VI p. 157, vol. VII pp. 203–204, vol. VII p. 398 and last vol. p. 112.

External links 
 Arc, Historical buildings and structures in Oslo (In Norwegian)
 Pharmacy Historical Museum of Norway at Kulturnett.no (In Norwegian)
 Photos

Buildings and structures in Oslo
Pharmacies of Norway
Retail companies established in 1857